The Memorial Union is located on the shore of Lake Mendota on the campus of the University of Wisconsin–Madison in Madison, Wisconsin. On the lakeshore to the north of the building is the Terrace, a popular outdoor space overlooking the lake. It has gained a reputation as one of the most beautiful student centers on a university campus.

History 
The exterior of the main wing was designed by University Architect Arthur Peabody. Opened October 5, 1928, the facility is operated by the Wisconsin Union, a membership organization. Porter Butts, the first director, called it a "college union" because it combines the characteristics of a student union ("student activity center" in other countries) and a student government ("students' union" in other countries) in an organization that brings together students, faculty, and members of the surrounding community.

The building was added to the National Register of Historic Places on May 19, 2015.

Facility 
Outside the main building is the Memorial Union Terrace, a stone outdoor dining and recreation area on the shore of Lake Mendota. The Terrace was designed by Peabody's daughter, Charlotte. It is a popular spot among students and local residents for socializing because of the backdrop of the lake, with its view of sailboats, and the sound of live music, usually free to the public in the evening. The Wisconsin Union Directorate funds music on the Terrace four nights a week in the summer, and on the Terrace or in der Rathskeller on weekends during the school year (depending on weather).

Within the Union are rooms and artworks reflecting the local heritage. The largest is Der Rathskeller, a German-style beerhall with elaborate murals, where political debates and card or board games are common among students over a beer. The Rathskeller directly connects the ground floor to the Terrace outside. Also on the ground floor are the Paul Bunyan Room and cafeterias. Upstairs are the Beefeater Room and the Old Madison Room. The west wing of the Union houses the Wisconsin Union Theater.

The Daily Scoop sells Babcock ice cream made at the University. Peet's Coffee Shop is a privately managed operation that serves coffee and pastries. The Campus and Community Information desk acts as an information and referral resource. There is a small retail shop offers newspapers, apparel, and snacks. The Memorial Union Box Office offers ticketing for campus events as well as bus tickets for the Van Galder Bus Line. Memorial Union houses several restaurants and cafeterias. A catering department serves conferences, events for the university, and weddings of Union members, and the annual Tudor Dinners.

The Memorial Union underwent extensive renovation starting in 2012. These renovations included a redesign of the Terrace, a renovation of the Wisconsin Union Theater, and the addition of new restaurants and study spaces.

In 2017, the 1.3-acre Alumni Park opened. The park is an art gallery and museum and displaying the accomplishments of Badgers throughout the 17 decades of the university.

The Hoofers, an activity group headquartered in the Union, offer activities on Lake Mendota and other outdoor sites.

Image gallery

References

External links

 Wisconsin Union website
 The Wisconsin Union—The First 75 Years (1904-79), interviews with Wisconsin Union Director Porter F. Butts
 Memorial Union in The Buildings of the University of Wisconsin

University of Wisconsin–Madison
Buildings and structures in Madison, Wisconsin
Student activity centers in the United States
National Register of Historic Places in Dane County, Wisconsin
National Register of Historic Places in Madison, Wisconsin